Peter Ho-sun Chan (born 28 November 1962) is a film director and producer.

Early life
Chan was born in British Hong Kong to Chinese parents. He and his family moved to Thailand when he was 12, where he grew up amongst the international Chinese community in Bangkok. He speaks Thai as fluently as a Thai person.

He later studied in the United States where he attended film school at UCLA, with a minor in accountancy. He returned to Hong Kong in 1983 for a summer internship in the film industry. Chan never returned to UCLA to complete his studies.

Career 
He served as second assistant director, translator, and producer on John Woo's Heroes Shed No Tears (1986), which was set in Thailand. He then was a location manager on three Jackie Chan films, Wheels on Meals (1984), The Protector (1985) and Armour of God (1986), all of which were shot overseas.

He joined Impact Films as a producer in 1989, guiding projects such as Curry and Pepper (1990) to completion.

His directorial debut, Alan and Eric: Between Hello and Goodbye, was crowned best film at the Hong Kong Film Directors' Guild in 1991. It also won best actor at the Hong Kong Film Awards for Eric Tsang, who would become a frequent collaborator with Chan.

Chan was a co-founder of United Filmmakers Organization (UFO) in the early 1990s, which produced a number of box-office and critical hits in Hong Kong, including his own: He Ain't Heavy, He's My Father.  Other critical and commercial successes followed, including Tom, Dick and Hairy, He's a Woman, She's a Man and Comrades, Almost a Love Story.

In the late 1990s, Chan worked in Hollywood, directing The Love Letter, which starred Kate Capshaw, Ellen DeGeneres and Tom Selleck.

In 2000, Chan co-founded Applause Pictures with Teddy Chen and Allan Fung.  The company's focus was on fostering ties with pan-Asian filmmakers, producing such films as Jan Dara by Thailand's Nonzee Nimibutr, One Fine Spring Day South Korea's Hur Jin-ho, Samsara by China's Huang Jianxin, The Eye by Danny and Oxide Pang and cinematographer Christopher Doyle.

Chan's 2005 film, the musical Perhaps Love closed the 2005 Venice Film Festival and was Hong Kong's entry for an Academy Awards nomination in the best foreign film category.  Perhaps Love became one of the year's top-grossing films in China, Hong Kong and Taiwan, and received a record 29 awards. Chan next directed The Warlords (2007) and produced Derek Yee's Protégé (2007). The two films were the two highest grossing Hong Kong-China co-productions of 2007. The Warlords grossed a record RMB220 million in China and over US$40 million across Asia, and garnered 8 Hong Kong Film Awards and 3 Golden Horse Awards, including Best Director and Best Feature Film.

In 2009, Chan produced Teddy Chen's Bodyguards and Assassins, which has garnered RMB300 million in China box office alone, accumulating over US$50 million Asia-wide. It has scored 8 awards in the Hong Kong Film Awards, including Best Film. It also won Best Actor awards for Wang Xueqi in the Asian Film Awards and the HK Film Critics Society Awards, adding up to 146 awards out of 231 nominations for Chan's awards track record.

In a survey conducted by the Hong Kong Trade Development Council during the 2010 Hong Kong Filmart, Chan was voted "the most valuable filmmaker", which was strongly backed by his box-office track records.

Personal life 
Chan dated Kathleen Poh for a brief period in 1993 before Poh moved to Singapore permanently. Chan currently has a daughter Jilian Chan (born in 2006) with Hong Kong actress Sandra Ng, although the two have no intention of getting married.

Filmography

As director

Alan and Eric: Between Hello and Goodbye (1991)
He Ain't Heavy, He's My Father (1993)
Tom, Dick and Hairy (1993)
He's a Woman, She's a Man (1994)
The Age of Miracles (1996)
Comrades, Almost A Love Story (1996)
Who's The Woman, Who's The Man (1996)
The Love Letter (1999)
Three (segment Going Home) (2002)
Project 1:99 (2003)
Perhaps Love (2005)
The Warlords (2007)
Dragon (2011)
American Dreams in China (2013)
Dearest (2014)
Li Na: My Life (TBA)
Leap (2020)

As producer

Heroes Shed No Tears (1986)
News Attack (1989)
Whampoa Blues (1990)
Curry and Pepper (1990)
Alan And Eric : Between Hello And Goodbye (1991)
Yesteryou, Yesterme, Yesterday (1991)
The Days of Being Dumb (1992)
He Ain't Heavy, He's My Father (1993)
He's A Woman, She's A Man (1994)
Over The Rainbow, Under The Skirt (1994)
Twenty Something (1994)
Happy Hour (1995)
The Age of Miracles (1996)
Who's The Woman, Who's The Man (1996)
Comrades: Almost a Love Story (1996)
Twelve Nights (2000)
Jan Dara (2001)
One Fine Spring Day (2001)
The Eye (2002)
Three (2002)
Golden Chicken (2002)
Golden Chicken 2 (2003)
The Eye 2 (2004)
Three...Extremes (2004)
The Eye 10 (2005)
Perhaps Love (2005)
Protégé (2007)
The Warlords (2007)
The Eye (remake) (2008)
Bodyguards and Assassins (2009)
Mr. and Mrs. Incredible (2011)
Dragon (2011)
The Guillotines (2012)
American Dreams in China (2013)
The Truth About Beauty (2014)
I Reciprocate Your Feelings (2014)
Soul Mate (2016)
This Is Not What I Expected (2017)
Last Letter (2018)
The Hort Park Proposal (2021)
Li Na: My Life (TBA)

As actor
Duo ming ke (1973)
Millionaires Express (1986) – Firefighter / Security officer
San dui yuan yang yi zhang chuang (1988) – Man betting on fight in lounge
Twin Dragons (1992)
C'est la vie, mon chéri (1993) – Man at Party
Wan 9 zhao 5 (1994) – (final film role)

References 

Koesnikov-Jessop, Sonia (12 January 2006) Play it again, but with music and in Chinese, International Herald Tribune, retrieved 19 January 2006.
Nassim and Francois (January 2003) A Conversation with Peter Chan, Cinemasie, retrieved 21 January 2006.
Long Pao, Jin (2002), The Pan-Asian Co-Production Sphere: An Interview With Peter Chan. Harvard Asia Quarterly 6 (3), retrieved 9 March 2006.
Elley, Derek (14 January 1998), 1998 10 to Watch, [Variety], retrieved 21 January 2006.

External links

We Pictures
Applause Pictures
Long interviews on Perhaps Love, The Warlords and more

1962 births
Hong Kong film directors
Hong Kong film producers
Living people
UCLA Film School alumni
Anglo-Chinese School alumni
Thai emigrants to Hong Kong
Peter Chan